The Last Bomb was a 1945 propaganda film mainly concerning the conventional phase of the bombing of Japan in 1945. It was nominated for an Academy Award for Best Documentary Feature.

The film begins by describing the taking off points in Saipan, Guam, and Tinian, remarking how they have changed since American occupation. General Curtis LeMay is shown planning a daylight raid on Japan's industrial areas.

Squadrons of B-29s then assemble and the audience rides with them through a space of ocean as wide as the US from Mexico to Canada, special attention being given to the island Iwo Jima, which is midway through the journey, the base for P-51 fighters that will escort the bombers. The film then proceeds to the actual bombing of Japan, showing one of the B-29s in combat with Japanese fighters, dogfights between the escorting P-51s and Japanese aircraft and the destruction leveled on Tokyo by the B-29s' payload and subsequent strafing by the escort fighters.

When the bombers return to base, the hazards of war are assessed, particularly the problems associated with landing the large planes, often damaged by Japanese flak or fighters, which could sometimes be fatal.

At the very end some color footage of the mushroom cloud at Nagasaki is shown, the narrator, Reed Hadley, telling us that it saves thousands of American lives by preventing an invasion of Japan.

References

External links 
 , uploaded by the National Archives and Records Administration
 
 

1945 films
American aviation films
Documentary films about military aviation
Films directed by Frank Lloyd
Documentary films about the atomic bombings of Hiroshima and Nagasaki
First Motion Picture Unit films
American documentary films
1945 documentary films
Japan in non-Japanese culture
1940s American films